John Cronin may refer to:
John Cronin (horticulturist) (1865–1923), director of the Royal Botanic Gardens, Melbourne
John Cronin (New Zealand politician), currently the chairperson of the Bay of Plenty's regional council
John Cronin (British politician) (1916–1986), British surgeon and Labour Party politician
John Cronin (convict) (born 1971), repeat-offence Scottish convict who become the first convict to be tracked by satellite in the UK
John Francis Cronin (1908–1994), priest, author of Communism: a World Menace
John Cronin (Massachusetts politician), US politician
John Cronin (ice hockey) (born 1980), former US hockey player
John Cronin (Gaelic footballer) (1923–1992), Irish Gaelic footballer